Tamsin Tilley Beaumont  (born 11 March 1991) is an English cricketer who currently plays for Kent, The Blaze, Welsh Fire, Sydney Thunder and England. She plays primarily as an opening batter and occasional wicket-keeper. She has previously played for Surrey Stars, Adelaide Strikers, Southern Vipers, Melbourne Renegades and London Spirit.

Beaumont was part of England's winning 2017 Women's Cricket World Cup team, and was the leading run-scorer in the tournament. She was subsequently named player of the tournament, and awarded an MBE in recognition of her achievements. In 2019, she was named as a Wisden Cricketer of the Year.

Early life and education
Beaumont was born in Dover, Kent. She began playing cricket in nearby Sandwich, where she also attended Sir Roger Manwood's School. When she was eight years old, her mother, Julie, secured her very first selection in a cricket team. Beaumont's brother, Michael, was captain of an Under-11 side coached by her father, Kevin, a research scientist. As Beaumont later explained to Wisden Cricketers' Almanack in 2019:

Before long, Beaumont, her brother and her father were all taking the field for the Sandwich Town Second XI, for which her father played as an off spin bowler. According to Beaumont:

As a child, Beaumont suffered from food allergies that slowed her growth. She was therefore not selected for Kent's Under-11 cricket team. On her mother's initiative, she took up gymnastics with the aim of building up her muscles, and eventually became a National Schools Gymnastics Champion. After leaving school, she studied chemistry and sports science at Loughborough University.

Domestic career
In early 2007, Beaumont made her debut for Kent, batting at number five and scoring 13 not out. Her first match for the county as wicket-keeper came two months later as Kent hosted Nottinghamshire, and Beaumont claimed two stumpings and a run out.  Later that summer, she was named in the England Development Squad side for the European Championship. She played in two matches, against Netherlands and Ireland, and made 7 & 8 respectively.

Beaumont continued to make regular appearances for Kent through the 2008 and 2009 seasons, and scored her maiden century in August 2009, hitting 136 off 144 balls to help set up a 184 run victory for Kent against the visiting Surrey side.  The following month she was called up to the England squad to tour the West Indies, as Sarah Taylor withdrew from the squad to focus on her studies. She made her international debut in the first One Day International of the tour, at Basseterre, on 4 November 2009.

She is the holder of one of the first tranche of 18 ECB central contracts for women players, which were announced in April 2014. On 9 May 2014 she along with Kathryn Cross and Lauren Winfield joined Chance to Shine Programme as a coaching ambassador. In April 2015, she was named as one of the England women's Academy squad tour to Dubai, where England women played their Australian counterparts in two 50-over games, and two Twenty20 matches.

In November 2016, she was signed by Adelaide Strikers for the second season of WBBL. In 2017, she was re-signed again by  Adelaide Strikers for the third season of WBBL. 

In 2021, she was drafted by London Spirit for the inaugural season of The Hundred. In April 2022, she was signed by the Welsh Fire for the 2022 season of The Hundred.

International career
At the 2017 Women's Cricket World Cup, Beaumont and Sarah Taylor scored the highest partnership for any wicket in Women's Cricket World Cup history, scoring 275 against South Africa. During the same World Cup, she along with Nat Sciver set what was at the time the record 4th wicket partnership (170) in Women's World Cup history. Beaumont went on to win the 2017 World Cup with England, and was voted player of the tournament, as the leading run-scorer, with 410 runs. Her contribution to England's success was recognised when she was appointed a Member of the Order of the British Empire (MBE) in the 2018 New Year Honours list.

In December 2017, she was named as one of the players in the ICC Women's ODI Team of the Year.

On 20 June 2018, she scored her first century in WT20Is, making 116 against South Africa in the second match of the 2018 England women's Tri-Nation Series. In the same match, England scored 250 runs, a new record for the highest innings total in WT20Is.

In October 2018, she was named in England's squad for the 2018 ICC Women's World Twenty20 tournament in the West Indies. Ahead of the tournament, she was named as one of the players to watch. In February 2019, she was awarded a full central contract by the England and Wales Cricket Board (ECB) for 2019.

In March 2019, during the first Women's Twenty20 International (WT20I) match against Sri Lanka, Beaumont scored her 1,000th run in WT20I cricket. In April 2019, she was named as a Wisden Cricketer of the Year.

In June 2019, the ECB named her in England's squad for their opening match against Australia to contest the Women's Ashes. In the second WODI of the series, Beaumont scored the first century in a WODI by an England cricketer in the Women's Ashes. In January 2020, she was named in England's squad for the 2020 ICC Women's T20 World Cup in Australia.

On 18 June 2020, Beaumont was named in a squad of 24 players to begin training ahead of international women's fixtures starting in England following the COVID-19 pandemic.

On 2 March 2021, Beaumont overtook Meg Lanning to top the MRF Tyres ICC Player Rankings for batters, and on 9 March she was subsequently named as the ICC's Female Player of the Month for February 2021.

In June 2021, Beaumont was named as in England's Test squad for their one-off match against India. In December 2021, Beaumont was named in England's squad for their tour to Australia to contest the Women's Ashes. In January 2022, she was named as the ICC women's T20I Cricketer of the Year for 2021. In February 2022, she was named in England's team for the 2022 Women's Cricket World Cup in New Zealand.

International centuries

One Day International centuries

T20 International centuries

Personal life
Beaumont has a long term partner. His name is Callum. Beaumont's England teammate Katherine Brunt has said that "... he is a really great guy."

According to the ECB, Beaumont's nickname is "Tambo", but Kent Cricket lists her nicknames as "Tamwarr", "Tamzo", "Tams" and "Titch" and "Squirrel".

References

Further reading

External links

1991 births
Living people
Sportspeople from Dover, Kent
People educated at Sir Roger Manwood's School
England women Test cricketers
England women One Day International cricketers
England women Twenty20 International cricketers
Kent women cricketers
Surrey Stars cricketers
Southern Vipers cricketers
The Blaze women's cricketers
London Spirit cricketers
Welsh Fire cricketers
Adelaide Strikers (WBBL) cricketers
Sydney Thunder (WBBL) cricketers
Melbourne Renegades (WBBL) cricketers
Wisden Cricketers of the Year
Members of the Order of the British Empire
Wicket-keepers